The 1919 Iowa State Cyclones football team represented Iowa State College of Agricultural and Mechanic Arts (later renamed Iowa State University) in the Missouri Valley Conference during the 1919 college football season. In their fifth and final season under head coach Charles Mayser, the Cyclones compiled a 5–2–1 record (3–1–1 against conference opponents), finished in second place in the conference, shut out six of eight opponents, and outscored opponents by a combined total of 73 to 20. They played their home games at State Field in Ames, Iowa. Gilbert Denfield was the team captain.

Schedule

References

Iowa State
Iowa State Cyclones football seasons
Iowa State Cyclones football